Headlee  is an unincorporated rural hamlet located in White County, in the U.S. state of Indiana.  It is also part of the Cass Township of Indiana.

History
A post office was established at Headlee in 1877, and remained in operation until 1907. The Headlee family were among the first settlers in the area.  The hamlet is entirely residential now.

Geography
Headlee is located on Indiana State Road 119, and is a short distance away from Lake Shafer in Buffalo and Monticello.

References

Unincorporated communities in White County, Indiana
Unincorporated communities in Indiana